Soldier's Bridge is a former settlement in Lassen County, California.

In the summer of 1860, First Lieutenant Hamilton from the San Francisco Presidio and fifty men built a bridge at the site, hence the name. Soldier's Bridge was on the Nobles Emigrant Trail.

John Pine operated a store and post office at Soldier's Bridge from 1864 to 1867.  The store and post office closed when Pine declared bankruptcy.

References

Former settlements in Lassen County, California
Former populated places in California